Marko Kerić (born 7 December 1980) is a Montenegrin retired football goalkeeper.

References

External links
 
 

1980 births
Living people
Footballers from Podgorica
Association football goalkeepers
Serbia and Montenegro footballers
Montenegrin footballers
FK Zeta players
FK Sevojno players
FC Spartak Trnava players
FK Kolubara players
FK Radnički Nova Pazova players
FK Rakovica players
FK Dorćol players
Slovak Super Liga players
Expatriate footballers in Slovakia
Montenegrin expatriate sportspeople in Slovakia
Montenegrin expatriate footballers
Expatriate footballers in Serbia
Montenegrin expatriate sportspeople in Serbia